The Westboro Baptist Church (WBC) is a small American, unaffiliated Primitive Baptist church in Topeka, Kansas, founded in 1955 by pastor Fred Phelps. Labeled a hate group, WBC is known for engaging in homophobic and anti-American pickets, as well as hate speech against atheists, Jews, Muslims, transgender people, and numerous Christian denominations. Their theology and practices have been widely condemned by Christian churches, including the Baptist World Alliance and the Southern Baptist Convention.

WBC has been involved in actions against gay people since 1989, later seeking a crackdown on homosexual activity at Gage Park near its headquarters. In addition to conducting anti-gay protests at military funerals, the organization pickets celebrity funerals and public events. Protests have also been held against Jews, Mormons, and Catholics. Many protests have included WBC members defacing the American flag, flying the flag upside down on a flagpole, and holding protest signs with inflammatory statements such as "God hates fags" and "Thank God for dead soldiers". WBC is monitored by the Anti-Defamation League and Southern Poverty Law Center.

In 2016, Forbes stated WBC had about 70 members. It is headquartered in Topeka, Kansas. The group was once headed by Fred Phelps, although its representatives said there had been no defined leader for some time before his death in March 2014. The group consists primarily of members of Phelps's extended family; however, some family members have left the group in protest at its hostile actions and attitudes. Several former members have accused the group of brainwashing.

History

Westboro Baptist Church originated as a branch of the East Side Baptist Church, established in 1931 on the east side of Topeka. In 1954, East Side hired Fred Phelps as an associate pastor, and then promoted him to pastor of its new plant, Westboro Baptist, which opened in 1955 on the west side of Topeka. Its first public service was held on November 27, 1955. After Westboro was established, Phelps broke ties with East Side to become independent of any Baptist denomination. His vitriolic preaching alienated most of the original congregation, who either returned to East Side or joined other congregations, leaving him with a small following consisting almost entirely of his own relatives and close friends.

Phelps was a veteran of the Civil Rights Movement in the 1960s. He founded the Phelps Chartered law firm in 1964, which has since been used to sue communities that are targets of Westboro's protests. 

Westboro Baptist first began protesting homosexuality in 1989 after the discovery of what they referred to as a "tearoom", meaning a public lavatory used for homosexual interactions. The group later began picketing Gage Park six blocks northwest of its headquarters in Topeka in 1991, saying it was a den of anonymous homosexual activity. Soon, its protests had spread throughout the city, and within three years WBC was traveling across the country. Phelps explained in 1994 that he considered the negative reaction to the picketing to be proof of his righteousness.

On August 20, 1995, a pipe bomb exploded outside the home of Shirley Phelps-Roper, the daughter of Fred Phelps. The blast damaged an SUV, a fence, and part of the house, but no one was injured. In 1996, two men were arrested for the bombing, and both admitted to causing the blast. They had believed Phelps-Roper's house was that of the pastor, and wanted to retaliate against Westboro's anti-gay protests at Washburn University. One of the bombers was fined $1,751 and was sentenced to 16 days in prison plus 100 hours of community service.

Fred Phelps died of natural causes on March 19, 2014. His daughter Shirley said a funeral would not be held because Westboro does not "worship the dead". He had previously been voted out of his leadership position and, according to representatives, the organization had no defined leader in the time leading up to his death.

Positions and views
Westboro Baptists believe in five point Calvinism, as reflected in the TULIP acronym that is displayed prominently at the front of the church sanctuary. They believe in limited atonement, unconditional election, and the double predestination of both the saved and the damned, which can weigh heavily on members as well as those who leave the church. According to Barrett-Fox, they see "moral living as a sign of election" and they say they have a duty to preach to the public, not to "save people" (who are predestined) but to spread a message of obedience to God. In her dissertation on Westboro Baptist, she labels this theology as hyper-Calvinist.

They see themselves as coming from the Primitive Baptist movement. Their Primitive Baptist practices include their style of worship, approach to church discipline, liturgical preferences and seeing themselves as from a "separatist, antiestablishment" lineage (p.66).

Anti-homosexuality
WBC is known for its homophobic rhetoric. The Anti-Defamation League (ADL) describes the group as "virulently homophobic", saying its anti-homosexual rhetoric is often a cover for antisemitism, anti-Americanism, racism and hatred of other Christian groups. The Southern Poverty Law Center (SPLC) has added WBC to a list of hate groups for its homophobia. The group has also expressed transphobic messages in its protests. Its homophobic outlook has led its members to protest LGBT pride events and funerals of those who died due to HIV/AIDS, as well as blame homosexuals for tragedies such as the terrorist attacks on September 11, 2001.

Antisemitism

In 1996, Phelps began a campaign called "Topeka's Baptist Holocaust", whereby he attempted to draw attention to attacks perpetrated against WBC picketers, saying they were not random but organized attacks orchestrated by Jews and homosexuals. Phelps announced, "Jews killed Christ", and "Fag Jew Nazis are worse than ordinary Nazis. They've had more experience. The First Holocaust was a Jewish Holocaust against Christians. The latest Holocaust is by Topeka Jews against Westboro Baptist Church."

In another statement, he said "Topeka Jews today stir up Kansas tyrants in persecuting Westboro Baptists. They whine about the Nazi Holocaust, while they perpetrate the Topeka Holocaust."

A March 25, 2006, flier regarding a Jewish adversary of Phelps uses the phrase "bloody Jew" four times and the phrase "evil Jew" more than once every 12 sentences. The Anti-Defamation League has criticized WBC and Phelps, and keeps a sampling of WBC's fliers regarding Judaism on their website.

In an interview, Margie Phelps said WBC targeted the American Jewish community because members had "testified" to gentiles for 19 years that "America is doomed" and that "Now it's too late. We're done with them." She also claimed Jews were "one of the loudest voices" in favor of homosexuality and abortion, and that "[Jews] claim to be God's chosen people. Do you think that God is going to wink at that forever?" Phelps concluded by stating, in an apparent reference to the Book of Revelation, that all the nations of the world would soon march on Israel, and that they would be led by President Barack Obama, whom she called the "Antichrist".

Islamophobia
Jael Phelps said in a 2011 interview that she and the other members of WBC tauntingly and publicly burned a copy of the Quran while being scolded by a Muslim man, calling it an "idolatrous piece of trash" and that they were giving it the "proper respect that it deserves" by doing so. They picketed the funeral of the Muslim man's wife the following week. Jael Phelps said the wife's death was partly due to her Muslim husband having spoken out against WBC, and therefore rejecting God and bringing his "righteous judgement" down upon him. She also commented that "all those angry little Muslims can just shut their mouths."

Barack Obama conspiracy theories
Margie Phelps, daughter of Fred Phelps and attorney for WBC, said in an interview with Fox News that Barack Obama would "absolutely" be going to Hell and that he was "most likely the Beast spoken of in the Revelation." She also said Obama's presidency was a sign of the Apocalypse. On January 20, 2013, picketers of the Westboro Baptist Church protested Obama's second inauguration. The protesters had a legal permit and used signs with homophobic messages as well as referring to Obama as the Antichrist.

Structure and picketing 

WBC consists primarily of members of Fred Phelps's extended family. According to Forbes, it has roughly 70 members as of 2016, having previously had 80 members in 2011. In her book on Westboro Baptists, religious studies scholar Rebecca Barrett-Fox describes their identification with Primitive Baptists.  Members attend a weekly service and believe in a theology of predestination which includes believing all disasters and catastrophes come from the hand of God. Members follow the organization's 'literal' interpretation of the Bible which informs their attitudes towards homosexuality and towards Judaism. The religious justification for active political hate speech has led to much controversy.

WBC's travel expenses have exceeded as much as $200,000 annually. One of Westboro's followers estimated the organization spends $250,000 a year on picketing. According to the Southern Poverty Law Center, it is funded entirely from within the organization and accepts no outside donations. WBC has received money from lawsuits and legal fees, through the closely related Phelps Chartered law firm, when its protests have been unlawfully disrupted. For example, the firm sued the city of Topeka several times in the 1990s, and received $16,500 in legal fees for a court case won against a Marine's bereaved father. Because the firm represents WBC in its lawsuits, it can use money from cases it wins to further fund the organization under the Civil Rights Attorney's Fees Award Act of 1976. WBC is considered a nonprofit organization by the federal government, and is therefore exempt from paying taxes. All five of Phelps Chartered's lawyers are Phelps's children, and eleven of his thirteen children are lawyers. Members of the Phelps family are expected to give ten percent of their earnings to WBC.

WBC carries out daily picketing in Topeka and travels nationally to picket the funerals of gay victims of murder or gay-bashing, as well as those of people who have died from complications related to AIDS. It also pickets other events related or peripherally related to homosexuality; Kansas City Chiefs football games, and live pop concerts. At its peak, the group was able to picket roughly 15 churches a day, including many in Topeka and some events farther afield. The group has protested a number of high-profile events such as the funerals of victims of the Sandy Hook Elementary School shooting and the West Nickel Mines School shooting. As well as protesting these high-profile events, WBC protests many local low-profile events. While the messages are widely condemned, it always ensures its protests are legal in nature. Through keeping the protests non-violent and acquiring the proper permits, WBC avoids legal trouble. However, it is the protesting of military funerals that led to the organization receiving much attention. Its public acts have cast a political spotlight on the group that has given it vast attention for its small size. On two occasions, WBC accepted offers for radio air time in exchange for canceling an announced protest.

WBC also releases parody songs. According to Steve Drain (WBC's public information officer) in an interview with Vice News, "When we make our choice of songs, that really revolves around mostly popularity. It's mostly mainstream stuff, the whole idea of our doing parodies is to preach."

Legal responses

Laws limiting funeral protests
In response to the protests conducted by Westboro members at Indiana funerals, a bill was introduced in the Indiana General Assembly that would make it a felony to protest within  of a funeral. The bill provides penalties of up to three years in prison and a $10,000 fine for those found to be in violation of the law. Shortly before this bill was signed members of the church had threatened to protest in Kokomo, Indiana, at a funeral service that was being held for a soldier who was killed in Iraq. On January 11, 2006, the bill unanimously (11–0) passed a committee vote, and while members of the church had traveled to Kokomo to protest, they were not seen during or after the funeral service. On May 23, 2006, the state of Michigan banned any intentional disruption of funerals within  of the ceremony. Violating the statute would be a felony, punishable by up to two years in prison and a $5,000 fine for the first offense and up to four years in prison and a $10,000 fine for a subsequent offense.

On May 17, 2006, the state of Illinois enacted Senate Bill 1144, the "Let Them Rest In Peace Act", to shield grieving military families from protests during funerals and memorial services of fallen military service members. A first-time violation of the Act is a Class C misdemeanor, punishable by up to 30 days in jail and a $1,500 fine, and a second or subsequent offense is a Class 4 felony punishable by one to three years in state prison and a fine of up to $25,000.

On March 29, 2006, the Respect for America's Fallen Heroes Act was introduced by Mike Rogers, a Republican member of the House. The bipartisan bill received a 408–3 vote in the House, after 21 representatives chose not to vote. The Senate unanimously voted in approval of the law. On May 29, 2006, President George W. Bush signed the bill into law at a Memorial Day ceremony at Arlington National Cemetery. The bill prohibits protests within  of the entrance of any cemetery under control of the National Cemetery Administration from 60 minutes before to 60 minutes after a funeral. Failing to adhere to this law can lead to a substantial fine of up to $100,000 or up to a year in prison. 

On January 11, 2011, the state of Arizona held an emergency legislative session to pass a bill barring protests within  of a funeral and within an hour from its beginning or end. The bill was swiftly signed into law ahead of the January 12 funeral of those killed in the 2011 Tucson shooting.

On August 2, 2012, Congress passed a bill that included restrictions on demonstrators at military funerals, which became law four days later when signed by President Obama, who condemned WBC. The church responded to the new law with a series of tweets condemning the restrictions.

Supreme Court case

On March 10, 2006, WBC picketed the funeral of Marine Lance Corporal Matthew A. Snyder in Westminster, Maryland. Snyder's father, Albert, sued for defamation, invasion of privacy, and intentional infliction of emotional distress. The lawsuit alleged Fred Phelps, Rebekah Phelps-Davis, and Shirley Phelps-Roper were responsible for publishing defamatory statements about the Snyder family on the internet, including that Albert and his wife had "raised [Matthew] for the devil" and taught him "to defy his Creator, to divorce, and to commit adultery". Other statements denounced them for raising their son Catholic. Snyder further alleged the defendants had intruded upon and staged protests at his son's funeral. The defamation count was dismissed on First Amendment grounds, but the case proceeded to trial on the remaining two counts.

District Judge Richard D. Bennett instructed the jury to decide "whether the defendant's actions would be highly offensive to a reasonable person, whether they were extreme and outrageous and whether these actions were so offensive and shocking as to not be entitled to First Amendment protection". On October 31, 2007, Phelps, Shirley Phelps-Roper and Rebecca Phelps-Davis were found liable for invasion of privacy and intentional infliction of emotional distress. The jury awarded Snyder a total of $10,900,000; $2.9 million in compensatory damages, $6 million in punitive damages for invasion of privacy and $2 million for causing emotional distress. The group unsuccessfully sought a mistrial based on alleged prejudicial statements made by the judge and violations of the gag order by the plaintiff's attorney. On February 4, 2008,  Bennett upheld the ruling but reduced the punitive damages to $2.1 million. Liens were ordered on WBC buildings and Phelps's law office in an attempt to ensure the damages would be paid.

On September 24, 2009, a federal appeals court reversed the lower court's award. It found the picket near the funeral was protected speech because it involved "matters of public concern, including the issues of homosexuals in the military, the sex-abuse scandal within the Catholic Church, and the political and moral conduct of the United States and its citizens", and did not violate the privacy of the service member's family. On March 30, 2010, the appeals court ordered Snyder to pay WBC's court costs of over $16,000, a move Snyder's attorneys referred to as "adding insult to injury".

On March 8, 2010, the Supreme Court granted certiorari in Snyder v. Phelps. On May 28, Senate Majority Leader Harry Reid and 42 other senators filed an amicus brief in support of Snyder. On June 1, Kansas Attorney General Stephen Six filed a separate brief supporting Snyder which was joined by the Attorneys General of 47 other states and the District of Columbia. Several news and civil rights organizations filed amicus briefs in support of Phelps. The Supreme Court ruled in favor of Phelps on March 2, 2011. Chief Justice John Roberts wrote of the 8–1 decision: "What Westboro said, in the whole context of how and where it chose to say it, is entitled to 'special protection' under the First Amendment and that protection cannot be overcome by a jury finding that the picketing was outrageous." Justice Samuel Alito, the lone dissenter, said Snyder wanted only to "bury his son in peace" and "Our profound national commitment to free and open debate is not a license for the vicious verbal assault that occurred in this case".

Other legal responses

In 1995, Phelps Sr.'s eldest grandson, Benjamin Phelps, was convicted of assault and disorderly conduct after spitting upon the face of a passerby during a picket.

In the 1990s, WBC won a series of lawsuits against the City of Topeka and Shawnee County for efforts taken to prevent or hinder WBC picketing, and was awarded approximately $200,000 in attorney's fees and costs associated with the litigation.

In 2004, Phelps Sr.'s daughter Margie Phelps and Margie's son Jacob were arrested for trespassing, disorderly conduct and failure to obey after disregarding a police officer's order during an attempted protest.

In June 2007 Shirley Phelps-Roper was arrested in Nebraska and charged with contributing to the delinquency of a minor. The arrest resulted from her allowing her ten-year-old son to step on a U.S. flag during the demonstration, which is illegal under Nebraska law. The defense contended that the child's actions were protected speech, and that the state law is unconstitutional. The prosecution claimed the demonstration was not intended as political speech, but as an incitement to violence, and that Phelps-Roper's conduct might also constitute child abuse. Prosecutors later dropped charges against Phelps-Roper.

On July 14, 2006, Mundy Township, Michigan billed WBC for $5,000, after it had informed the township authorities on June 28 that a protest was planned at the Swartz Funeral Home. The bill to WBC ensued, according to the local police chief, because the organization failed to keep a verbal contract for security. Fred Phelps's daughter claimed that the Holy Ghost had informed them not to fly to Michigan even though they had already purchased airline tickets. Security at the Webb funeral was high; 15 fire trucks were involved, as well as numerous police officers from nearby jurisdictions. The township has stated that it will not pursue the matter.

Entry bans
In August 2008, Canadian officials learned of WBC's intent to stage a protest at the funeral of Tim McLean, a Winnipeg resident who was killed on a bus. The protests intended to convey the message that the man's murder was God's response to Canadian laws permitting abortion, homosexuality, divorce and remarriage. In response, Canadian officials barred the organization's members from entering the country.

In February 2009, British news sources discovered WBC had announced, via its website, its intent to picket a youth production of The Laramie Project to be held at Central Studio, Queen Mary's College in the town of Basingstoke, Hampshire, on February 20, 2009. This would have been its first picket in the United Kingdom. In the lead-up to the picket, Members of Parliament, LGBT groups, and lobbyists appealed to British Home Secretary, Jacqui Smith, requesting WBC be blocked from entering the UK, on the basis of it inciting hatred towards LGBT people. On February 18, 2009, two days before the intended picket date, the Home Office announced Fred Phelps and Shirley Phelps-Roper would be specifically excluded from entering the UK for having "engaged in unacceptable behaviour by inciting hatred against a number of communities", and also other members "could also be flagged and stopped if they tried to enter Britain".

Parodies

A slogan commonly invoked at the counter-protests is "God hates figs". Parodying WBC all-capitals "God hates fags" signs, the counter-protest signs often invoke a passage in the Biblical book of Matthew to justify the claim about God and his feelings about figs. The signs have been noted at counter-protests at the University of Chicago; in Spartanburg, South Carolina; and in Portsmouth, New Hampshire, as well as at the non-WBC-themed Rally to Restore Sanity. The use of these satirical signs has been praised by the ACLU and others.

Documentation given out at various counter-protests cite biblical verses in which Jesus says that none should eat the fruit of a fig tree, in which Jesus causes a fig tree to wither, and in which God promises as a punishment to make someone like bad figs.

Other sites and organizations have parodied the slogans of WBC, including God Hates Fred Phelps, God Hates Bags, and God Hates Shrimp. The Cooper family in Kevin Smith's 2011 film Red State was reportedly inspired by WBC.

Criticisms

Criticism from Christians and Christian organizations 
Baptist churches, Baptist-affiliated seminaries, and Baptist conventions, including the Baptist World Alliance and the Southern Baptist Convention (two of the largest Baptist groups), have denounced WBC over the years. In addition, other mainstream Christian denominations have condemned the actions of WBC. Katherine Weber of The Christian Post states that "Westboro is considered an extremist group by most mainstream Christian churches and secular groups, and is well known for its aggressive protesting style."

An alliance of six British religious groups (the Methodist Church of Great Britain, Baptist Union of Great Britain, United Reformed Church, Evangelical Alliance UK, Faithworks, and Bible Society-funded thinktank Theos) made a joint statement on February 19, 2009, in support of the government's entry ban for members of WBC. They condemned the activities of WBC, stating:

Evangelist pastor Jerry Falwell Sr. referred to Fred Phelps as "a first-class nut". WBC picketed Falwell's funeral service on May 22, 2007.

In 2013, Christian rock band Five Iron Frenzy recorded a song titled "God Hates Flags" condemning the actions of the Westboro Baptist Church and similar organizations, including such lyrics as "If God is love you got it wrong waving all your placards and flags".

Other criticisms 
A number of Phelps's critics have suggested that the actions of WBC are merely a ploy to receive attention and publicity above all else, though the Phelpses themselves deny this claim. Counter-protesting against the group, they suggest, gives them attention and incentive that they do not deserve; and a more effective response against Phelps would be to ignore his family and congregation completely.

A frequent critic of WBC is political commentator Bill O'Reilly, who regularly calls WBC "evil and despicable".  During Snyder v. Phelps, O'Reilly offered to pay the entire amount of Albert Snyder's legal costs. Documentary filmmaker Michael Moore has also criticized WBC.

In response to WBC's announcement that they would picket the vigil for victims of the 2012 Sandy Hook Elementary School shooting, several petitions to the White House (using the We the People system) were submitted, calling on President Barack Obama to legally recognize WBC as a hate group, revoke its tax exemption for religious organizations, and to ban protests at funerals and memorial services. One petition, backed by the hacktivist group Anonymous, was submitted the day of the shootings, and reached more than 75,000 signatures within two days.

Rapper Mac Lethal uploaded a video titled "Beatbox + iPhone + Guitar + Fast Rap = Win" on December 18, 2012, that took inspiration from the actions of WBC and the media after the Sandy Hook Elementary School shooting. Some of the lyrics include:

Former members 
Since 2004, over 20 members of WBC, mostly family members, have left the organization and the Phelps family. Several of them have accused WBC of brainwashing.

Mark Phelps, estranged son of WBC's founder, Fred Phelps, left the organization in 1973 and began "formal healing therapy in 1988 and worked toward healing and restoration, overcoming the horrible pain and fear from the 19 years of living with" his father. Mark was re-baptized in a local church in 1994 and stated: "If I had to take my family to court and convict them of being followers of Christ, I am not sure where I would find the evidence."

Libby Phelps-Alvarez, a granddaughter of the late Fred Phelps and daughter of Fred Phelps Jr. left WBC in 2009. In 2017, she released a book entitled Girl on a Wire: Walking the Line Between Faith and Freedom. The book documents her years in WBC and what lead up to her decision to leave and eventual departure. Phelps-Alvarez is now an advocate for gay equality.

Zach Phelps-Roper is the grandson of Fred Phelps and the fourth sibling of the Phelps-Roper family to leave WBC (besides Megan and Grace mentioned below, brothers Joshua and Noah have also left). After attempting to leave the organization five times previously, he finally left in 2014 after his views began to change. He now preaches about a life of empathy and unconditional love.

Danielle Phelps, granddaughter of Fred Phelps, left the church in 2014 shortly after her grandfather's death. She is openly gay and joined the US Marine Corps after leaving the church. In an interview with Harry Robinson on the All Out Attack Podcast, Danielle revealed that Steve Drain, father of Lauren Drain and one of the elders of the church after Fred Phelps's passing, and the rest of his family, had reportedly been excommunicated from the church.

Nathan Phelps

Nathan Phelps is another estranged son of Fred. He left Westboro on his 18th birthday in 1976. He has stated that he never had a relationship with his abusive father when he was growing up, and that WBC is an organization for his father to "vent his rage and anger." He has also stated that, in addition to hurting others, his father used to physically abuse his wife and children by beating them with his fists and with the handle of a mattock to the point of bleeding. Phelps's brother Mark has supported and repeated Nathan's claims of physical abuse by their father.

In March 2014, Nathan posted on Facebook that his father was in a hospice in Topeka and was near death, and that Fred was excommunicated from WBC in August 2013, for unclear reasons. These assertions were later reaffirmed by Mark Phelps. Nathan had previously predicted the organization may fall into leadership and theological crises when Fred died, because he had been the binding figure and because their beliefs hold that they are immortal, which would be disproved with the death of a member. WBC spokesperson Steve Drain denied Fred Sr. was on the verge of death and refused to confirm the reported excommunication. Fred Sr. died three days later.

Megan Phelps-Roper 

Megan Phelps-Roper, a grandchild of Fred Phelps, left WBC in 2012 together with her sister Grace, and explained her reasons and experiences in a TED talk. In 2015, Sam Harris published an interview with her. She has written a book entitled Unfollow: A Journey from Hatred to Hope, leaving the Westboro Baptist Church. She has been making a film about her experiences and notes that four of her siblings have also left WBC.

Lauren Drain 

Lauren Drain, another former member of WBC who was excommunicated in 2008, released an autobiography titled Banished in March 2013. She characterizes children, like herself, as being brainwashed into their belief system and describes consequences of questioning their belief system, such as her banishment.

Documentary media coverage

In 2001, Sundance Channel aired the film A Union in Wait, a documentary about same-sex marriage directed by Ryan Butler. Phelps and members of WBC appeared in the film after Phelps picketed Wake Forest Baptist Church at Wake Forest University over a proposed same-sex union ceremony.

In 2005, the British satellite company British Sky Broadcasting produced an investigative piece using hidden cameras, which included footage of two of Phelps's granddaughters, Libby and Jael. In the testimonial, Libby and Jael explain that they hope and pray that no one outside of Westboro becomes "elect", because they want everyone else in the world to die horribly and burn in Hell, and that even if they did not believe their actions were dictated by God, they would still do and enjoy them anyway.

On April 1, 2007, British television channel BBC Two broadcast Louis Theroux's The Most Hated Family in America. Theroux has presented a number of documentaries about unusual or unconventional people and groups in the UK, the US and elsewhere. In the documentary, Theroux questioned Shirley Phelps-Roper as to whether she had considered if Westboro's protests were more likely to "put people off the Word of Jesus Christ and the Bible". In response, she said, "You think our job is to win souls to Christ. All we do, by getting in their face and putting these signs in front of them and these plain words, is make what's already in their heart come out of their mouth." Later in the documentary, Phelps-Roper agreed the $200,000 WBC annually spent to fly to funerals to protest was money spent to spread "God's hate". While being filmed by Theroux, it picketed a local appliance store because the store sold Swedish vacuum cleaners, which the group viewed as being supportive of gay people because of Swedish prosecution of Åke Green, a pastor critical of homosexuality.

The website godhatesfags.com was prominently featured in The Jeremy Kyle Show, a talk show aired on the ITV network in the United Kingdom on June 5, 2007. Shirley Phelps-Roper and her daughters had been invited to express their beliefs live via satellite. On the show, Kyle criticized the Phelpses for their beliefs and referred to the Phelps children as "completely and utterly brainwashed", and to Phelps-Roper herself as "deranged".

In the June 21, 2007, Channel 4 documentary Keith Allen Will Burn in Hell, starring Keith Allen, on which Phelps-Roper and some of her children agreed to appear, Phelps-Roper admitted on camera that her oldest son, Samuel, was born out of wedlock. Allen declared Phelps-Roper's vocal condemnation of strangers having sexual congress outside of marriage to be hypocritical as she was guilty of the same thing.

Louis Theroux made a follow-up to his first documentary which was broadcast in the UK on April 3, 2011, America's Most Hated Family in Crisis. Theroux reported that Westboro was in a state of "crisis" and documented the departure of several young members. Since then, two more prominent members have left WBC. Louis returned for a third documentary, Surviving America's Most Hated Family, in 2019.

Gallery

See also

Anti-Catholicism in the United States
Antisemitism in the United States
Criticism of Christianity
Hate speech
Islamophobia in the United States
List of organizations designated by the Southern Poverty Law Center as anti-LGBT hate groups
Societal attitudes toward homosexuality

Notes

References

External links

 (godhatesfags.com)
Funeral Protests: Selected Federal Laws and Constitutional IssuesCongressional Research Service

 
1955 establishments in Kansas
Organizations based in Topeka, Kansas
Right-wing antisemitism
Anti-Zionism in the United States
Antisemitism in the United States
Islamophobia in the United States
Organizations that oppose LGBT rights in the United States
Baptist churches in Kansas
Calvinist denominations established in the 20th century
Criticism of atheism
Criticism of Islam
Criticism of Judaism
Obscenity controversies
Christian organizations established in 1955
Protestantism-related controversies
Religious controversies in the United States
Late modern Christian antisemitism
Homophobia
Transphobia